The Karha is a river flowing through the Indian state of Maharashtra. Its basin lies in the parts of Pune. The cities of Baramati, Saswad and Jejuri, the place of Lord Khandoba, lie on the banks of this river. The Karha is a tributary of the Nira River. It is said that the Karha's water flows fastest amongst all tributaries of the Nira River.

Geography 
The Karha is considered one of the holy rivers. A temple of Lord Ganesha, one amongst the Ashtavinayaka, the Moreshwar of Moregaon is situated on the banks of the river. The river has a significant importance in Jejuri, considered holy for the devotees of Lord Khandoba. The origin of Karha River is near the Garade Village in Saswad Taluka and merges with the Nira River near Songaon in the Baramati Tehsil.

History 
On the banks of the Karha, a great Marathi socialist writer and filmmaker, P. K. Atre was born. He was one of the leaders in the Sanyukta Maharashtra movement. His series of books on the movement, Karheche Pani कऱ्हेचे पाणी is a famous piece of literature in Marathi.

See also

List of rivers of India
Rivers of India

References

External links

Rivers of Maharashtra
Rivers of India